This is a list of electoral results for the Electoral district of Marmion in Western Australian state elections.

Members for Marmion

Election results

Elections in the 1980s

References

Western Australian state electoral results by district